Ellinoroson, literally 'of the Greek-Russians',  is a neighbourhood of Athens, Greece. As its name suggests, the area was first inhabited by Greeks fleeing from Russia.

The Katechaki metro station serves Line 3 of the Athens Metro.

Neighbourhoods in Athens